Seth Olsen (born December 17, 1985) is a former American football guard who played in the National Football League. He played college football at Iowa. He was drafted by the Denver Broncos in the fourth round of the 2009 NFL Draft.

Early years
He played for Millard North High School located in Omaha, Nebraska for Head Coach Fred Petito who also produced Heisman Trophy Winner Eric Crouch. Seth excelled on the football field and was a First-team All-Stater in his junior and senior seasons. He was also a High School Parade All-American. Led his team to 3 consecutive undefeated conference seasons and appeared in the State Championship game in his junior and senior seasons. Won the 2003 State Championship. Earned EA sports All-American status. Teammate at Iowa with former Millard North players Adam Shada and Jeff Tarpinian.

College career
Seth played four years for the University of Iowa after redshirting his freshman year. He played Right Guard. He earned First-team All-American Honors by Rivals.com. In his redshirt freshman season saw action in nearly every game and was named to the freshman all conference team. In his sophomore year saw action in first couple games before moving to right guard and starting every game after that. Named the Next man in Award on offense. Started every game at right guard in 2007 and was named All-Big 10 honorable mention. In his senior year in 2008 started every game at right guard and was named First-team All-American Honors by Rivals.com.

Professional career

Denver Broncos
The Broncos selected Olsen in the 4th round (132nd overall) of the 2009 NFL Draft.  On July 23, 2009, Olsen signed a four-year, $2.615 million contract with a $414,120 signing bonus.  His base salary was $310,000 in 2009, $395,000 in 2010, $480,000 in 2011, and $565,000 in 2012. Olsen was waived during final cuts on September 4, 2010.

Minnesota Vikings
After being released by the Broncos, he was subsequently signed by the Minnesota Vikings to their practice squad. He was waived on September 10, 2011.

Indianapolis Colts
On September 12, he was claimed off waivers by the Indianapolis Colts.  Olsen made his first start against the Tennessee Titans during week 8 of the 2011 NFL Season at left guard.

Second stint with Vikings
Olsen signed with the Minnesota Vikings on March 19, 2013.  Olsen was released from the Vikings after reaching an injury settlement on September 9, 2013.

References

External links
Indianapolis Colts bio
Iowa Hawkeyes bio

1985 births
Living people
Sportspeople from Omaha, Nebraska
Players of American football from Nebraska
American football offensive guards
Iowa Hawkeyes football players
Denver Broncos players
Minnesota Vikings players
Indianapolis Colts players
People from Willmar, Minnesota